The Aeolus was manufactured between 1914 and 1916 with a 147cc two-stroke engine by the Bown Manufacturing Company, between 1919 and 1924 the machine was branded as Bownian

References

Motorcycles introduced in the 1910s